The Union Pacific Railroad , legally Union Pacific Railroad Company and often called simply Union Pacific, is a freight-hauling railroad that operates 8,300 locomotives over  routes in 23 U.S. states west of Chicago and New Orleans. Union Pacific is the second largest railroad in the United States after BNSF, with which it shares a duopoly on transcontinental freight rail lines in the Western, Midwestern and West South Central United States.

Founded in 1862, the original Union Pacific Rail Road was part of the first transcontinental railroad project, later known as the Overland Route. Over the next century, UP absorbed the Missouri Pacific Railroad, the Western Pacific Railroad, the Missouri–Kansas–Texas Railroad and the Chicago, Rock Island and Pacific Railroad. In 1995, the Union Pacific merged with Chicago and North Western Transportation Company, completing its reach into the Upper Midwest. In 1996, the company merged with Southern Pacific Transportation Company, itself a giant system that was absorbed by the Denver and Rio Grande Western Railroad. The Union Pacific Railroad is the principal operating company of the Union Pacific Corporation, which are both headquartered at the Union Pacific Center, in Omaha, Nebraska.

History

Union Pacific in the 19th century

The original company, the "Union Pacific Rail Road", incorporated on July 1, 1862, under the Pacific Railroad Act of 1862. President Abraham Lincoln had approved the act, which authorized railroad construction from the Missouri River to the Pacific to ensure the stability of the Union throughout the American Civil War, but construction did not complete until after that conflict's conclusion. The resulting track ran westward from Council Bluffs, Iowa to meet in Utah the Central Pacific Railroad line, which had been constructed eastward from Sacramento, California. The combined Union Pacific–Central Pacific line became known as the First transcontinental railroad and later the Overland Route.

The line was constructed primarily by Irish labor who had learned their craft during the recent Civil War. Under the guidance of its dominant stockholder Dr. Thomas Clark Durant, the namesake of the city of Durant, Iowa, the first rails were laid in Omaha.

The original UP was entangled in the Crédit Mobilier scandal, exposed in 1872. As detailed by the New York Sun, Union Pacific's largest construction company, Crédit Mobilier, had overcharged Union Pacific; the railroad would then pass the inflated costs on to the United States government. To convince the federal government to accept the increased costs, Crédit Mobilier had bribed multiple congressmen. Several prominent UP board members (including Durant) had been involved in the scheme. The ensuing financial crisis of 1873 led to a credit crunch, but not bankruptcy.

As boom followed bust, the Union Pacific continued to expand. A new company, with dominant stockholder Jay Gould, purchased the old on January 24, 1880. Gould already owned the Kansas Pacific (originally called the Union Pacific, Eastern Division, though in essence a separate railroad), and sought to merge it with UP. Through that merger, the original "Union Pacific Rail Road" transformed into "Union Pacific Railway".

Extending towards the Pacific Northwest, Union Pacific built or purchased local lines to reach Portland, Oregon. Towards Colorado, it built the Union Pacific, Denver and Gulf Railway: a system combining narrow-gauge trackage into the heart of the Rockies and a standard gauge line that ran south from Denver, across New Mexico, and into Texas.

The Union Pacific Railway would later declare bankruptcy during the Panic of 1893. The resulting corporate reorganization reversed Gould's name change: Union Pacific "Railway" merged into a new Union Pacific "Railroad".

Union Pacific in the 20th century
In the early 20th century, Union Pacific's focus shifted from expansion to internal improvement. Recognizing that farmers in the Central and Salinas Valleys of California grew produce far in excess of local markets, Union Pacific worked with its rival Southern Pacific to develop a spoilage-resistant rail-based transport system. These efforts came culminated in the 1906 founding of Pacific Fruit Express, soon to be the world's largest lessee of refrigerated railcars.

Meanwhile, Union Pacific worked to construct a faster, and more direct substitute for the original climb to Promontory Summit. In 1904, the Lucin cutoff opened, reducing curvature and grades. The original route would eventually be stripped of track in 1942 to provide war scrap.

To attract customers during the Great Depression, Union Pacific's chairman W. Averell Harriman simultaneously sought to "spruce up" the quality of its rolling stock and to make its unique locations more desirable travel destinations. The first effort resulted in the purchase of the first streamlined train: the M-10000. The latter resulted in the Sun Valley ski resort in central Idaho; it opened in 1936 and finally was sold in 1964. Despite the fact that the M-10000 and its successors were among the first diesel locomotives, Union Pacific completed dieselization relatively late. In 1944, UP finally received delivery of its last steam locomotive: Union Pacific 844.

As the 20th century waned, Union Pacific recognized—like most railroads—that remaining a regional railroad would only lead to bankruptcy. On December 31, 1925, UP and its subsidiaries operated  routes and  tracks; in 1980, these numbers had remained roughly constant (9,266 route-miles and 15,647 track-miles). But in 1982, UP acquired the Missouri Pacific and Western Pacific railroads, and 1988, the Missouri–Kansas–Texas. By 1993, Union Pacific had doubled its system to  routes.

By then, few large (class I) railroads remained. The same year that Union Pacific merged with the Chicago and North Western (1995), Burlington Northern and ATSF announced merger plans. The impending BNSF amalgamation would leave one mega-railroad in control of the west. To compete, UP merged with Southern Pacific, thereby incorporating D&RGW and Cotton Belt, and forming a duopoly in the West. The merged railroad took the Union Pacific name.

Notable employees
Harry K. McClintock who worked as a Brakeman in Colorado 1917. The Big Rock Candy Mountains

Facilities

The Union Pacific system includes hundreds of yards. Most are flat yards used for local switching. Other types of yards include intermodal terminals and hump yards. Most UP intermodal terminals are typically ports, but UP also has inland terminals for transfers to trucks, such as the terminal in San Antonio that opened in 2009 or the one in Santa Teresa, New Mexico, that opened in 2014.

Hump yards
In 2006, Union Pacific had 12 major active hump yards:

Albina Yard in Portland, Oregon, present since 1881.
Bailey Yard in North Platte, Nebraska
 Beaumont Yard in Beaumont, Texas
 Davidson Yard in Fort Worth, Texas
 Davis Yard in Roseville, California

 Englewood Yard in Houston, Texas
 Gateway Yard in East St Louis, Illinois, owned by subsidiary Alton and Southern Railway
 Livonia Yard in Livonia, Louisiana
 North Little Rock Yard in North Little Rock, Arkansas
 Proviso Yard in Northlake, Illinois, owned by Chicago and North Western Transportation Company until 1995
 Strang Yard in La Porte, Texas
 West Colton Yard in Bloomington, California

In the late 2010s, Union Pacific began deactivating hump yards in favor of flat switching.  In this, Union Pacific followed the industry-wide trend towards Precision Scheduled Railroading (PSR); railway executive Hunter Harrison explained that under PSR, few yards receive enough variegated traffic to necessitate a hump.  Union Pacific also closed facilities in Kansas City ("Neff yard"), Hinkle, Oregon, and Pine Bluff, Arkansas in 2019.

Locomotives and rolling stock
Union Pacific has owned some of the most powerful locomotives. These include members of the Challenger-type (including the 3985), and the Northern-type (including the 844), as well as the Big Boy steam locomotives (including the 4014). Union Pacific ordered the first diesel streamliner, the largest fleet of turbine-electric locomotives in the world, and still owns the largest operational diesel locomotive (the 6936).

Paint and colors

The yellow paint scheme was introduced in the spring of 1934. Engineers claimed the visibility of yellow would reduce grade crossing accidents. In 1941, UP introduced its yellow and gray color scheme with red highlights, which remains in use today.

The middle two-thirds of the locomotive body is painted Armour Yellow, a color used by Armour and Company on the packaging of its meat products. A thin band of Signal Red divides this from the Harbor Mist Gray (a light gray) used for the body and roof above that point. There is also a thin band of Signal Red along the bottom of the locomotive body, but this color has gradually become yellow as new Federal Railroad Administration (FRA) regulations for reflectorized tape came into effect in 2005; the trucks (painted Aluminum from 1955 to 1982), underframe, fuel tanks and everything else beneath that line are also Harbor Mist Gray. Lettering and numbering are in Signal Red, with black outlines. Most locomotives have white-outlined blue "wings" on the nose, on either side of the renowned shield featuring white lettering on a blue background and, below it, red and white vertical stripes. Beginning in early 2002, a number of units were repainted with a large, billowing American flag with the corporate motto "Building America" on the side, where the 'UNION PACIFIC' lettering is normally positioned.

Merger partner locomotives

Until 2017, UP operated some locomotives still in the paint scheme of their former railroads. In addition, some locomotives were renumbered by UP, varying in the degree of the previous railroads' logos being eradicated, but always with a yellow patch applied over the locomotive's former number and a new UP number applied on the cab. That allowed UP to number locomotives into its roster without spending the time and money necessary to perform a complete repaint. In May 2015, UP rostered 212 "patches", consisting of:
 22 Chicago and North Western (whose CNW logos have been hidden by the "patches"),
 174 Southern Pacific (AC4400CW, GP40-2, MP15AC, and GP60)
 14 St. Louis Southwestern (GP60)
 2 Denver and Rio Grande Western (GP60)
While not technically a predecessor locomotive in the traditional sense, UP also rostered a single SD40-2 (3564, since retired) still in the 1970s paint scheme, not counting DDA40X No. 6936, which was part of the Union Pacific Heritage Fleet until 2022.

In 2017, Union Pacific decided to repaint all locomotives which were not in the current corporate colors. , only 41 locomotives remained unpainted.

Commemorative color schemes
From the second half of 2005 to the summer of 2006, UP unveiled a new set of six EMD SD70ACe locomotives in "Heritage Colors", painted in schemes reminiscent of railroads acquired by the Union Pacific Corporation since the 1980s. The engine numbers match the year that the predecessor railroad became part of the Union Pacific system. The locomotives commemorate the Missouri Pacific with UP 1982, the Western Pacific with UP 1983, the Missouri–Kansas–Texas with UP 1988, the Chicago and North Western with UP 1995, the Southern Pacific with UP 1996, and the Denver and Rio Grande Western with UP 1989.

In October 2005, UP unveiled SD70ACe 4141, commissioned in honor of George Bush. The locomotive has "George Bush 41" on the sides and its paint scheme resembles that of Air Force One. It was sent into storage in 2007, but returned in 2018 to power Bush's funeral train. It was donated to the George H.W. Bush Presidential Library and Museum on November 8, 2019.

On March 31, 2010, UP dedicated a specially painted GE ES44AC locomotive commemorating the centennial of the Boy Scouts of America.

On September 28, 2010, UP dedicated a specially painted GE ES44AC locomotive, as a tribute to Susan G. Komen for the Cure.

On October 19, 2017, Union Pacific unveiled SD70AH 1943, "The Spirit of the Union Pacific", which is painted in a scheme to honor the United States armed forces.

On June 6, 2019, Union Pacific unveiled SD70ACe 1111, the "Powered By Our People" unit.

In April 2021, Union Pacific repainted an SD70M into a commemorative paint scheme called "We Are ONE" to honor Juneteenth and Pride Month.

UP also has a collection of locomotives painted for Operation Lifesaver, a rail safety organization founded in 1970.

2013 locomotive roster

As of October 2013, the Union Pacific had 8,185 locomotives on its active roster. The locomotive fleet consists of 43 different models and had an average age of 17.8 years. According to Union Pacific, this is the largest fleet of diesel-electric locomotives in the US.

Heritage Equipment

Union Pacific continues to use a small number of "heritage" steam locomotives and early streamlined diesel locomotives. This equipment is used on special charters (excursions).

Low-emissions locomotives
Union Pacific maintains an extensive fleet of low-emissions locomotives. Most are used in Los Angeles basin rail yards, to satisfy an air quality agreement with the local authorities.

Facts and figures

According to UP's 2007 Annual Report to Investors, at the end of 2007 it had more than 50,000 employees, 8,721 locomotives, and 94,284 freight cars.

Broken down by specific type of car, owned and leased:
 35,437 covered hoppers
 12,272 boxcars
 18,647 open-top hoppers
 13,780 gondolas
 14,148 "other" types of cars

In addition, it owns 6,950 different pieces of maintenance of way work equipment. At the end of 2007, the average age of UP's locomotive fleet was 14.8 years, the freight car fleet 28 years.

UP was ranked 134th on the 2019 Fortune 500 list of the largest United States corporations by revenue and had 41,967 employees. The president of Union Pacific since 2015 is Lance Fritz.

Union Pacific has been rated the worst company to work for in 2019 by 247wallst.com, citing CEO Lance Fritz's 12% approval rating and the 22% recommendation rating from Glassdoor.com.

Passenger service

Commuter services
When Union Pacific bought out the Chicago & North Western in 1995, it inherited the railroad's Metra commuter rail services in the Chicago metropolitan area: the UP/North, UP/Northwest, and UP/West lines, all of which operate from the Ogilvie Transportation Center (the former North Western Station–a name still used by many Chicago residents). In order to ensure uniformity across the Chicago area commuter rail system, trains are branded as Metra services and use Metra equipment. However, Union Pacific crews continue to operate the trains under a purchase-of-service agreement.

Former services

Between 1869 and 1971, Union Pacific operated passenger service throughout its historic "Overland Route". These trains ran between Chicago and Omaha on the Chicago & Northwestern trackage starting in 1936. Disputes over trackage rights and passenger revenues with the C&NW prompted the UP to switch to the Milwaukee Road for the handling of its streamliner trains between Chicago and Omaha beginning in late 1955.  The last intercity passenger train operated by UP was the westbound City of Los Angeles, arriving at LA Union Station on May 2. Since then, Union Pacific has satisfied its common carrier requirements by hosting Amtrak trains.

Hosted trains
Many Amtrak and commuter rail routes use Union Pacific rails.  This list excludes the commuter services the company directly operates in Chicago (see above).

Amtrak
 Amtrak Cascades
 California Zephyr
 Capitol Corridor
 Coast Starlight
 Lincoln Service
 Missouri River Runner
 Pacific Surfliner
 San Joaquin
 Sunset Limited
 Texas Eagle

Commuter trains
Altamont Corridor Express
Caltrain
FrontRunner 
Metrolink
Riverside Line
Ventura County Line
RTD commuter rail 
G Line
Trinity Railway Express

Notable accidents

21st century
 September 4, 2007: a Union Pacific train derailment split the small town of Sergeant Bluff, Iowa. About 16 cars derailed, most carrying salt that spilled into snow-like piles. The derailment interrupted traffic for about two hours.
 June 24, 2012: three crew members died and caused a property damage of $15 million when two Union Pacific trains collided head-on just east of Goodwell, Oklahoma. The NTSB provided the probable causes as eastbound train's operator's vision problems and failure by the conductor to get backup assistance as required. NTSB stated UP did not comply with its own policies when it medically recertified the operator. The company only had six color tests despite the policy requiring a color test for 10 signals. 
 November 15, 2012: A UP train struck a parade float in Midland, Texas, killing four and injuring 16 passengers on the parade float.
 May 25, 2013: in Chaffee, Missouri, a Union Pacific train collided with a BNSF train at a level junction, injuring seven, and causing damages exceeding $10 million. The accident caused a Missouri Route M overpass to partially collapse and caused a fire. The investigation concluded the engineer most likely fell asleep, due to sleep apnea. Three months later, the Route M overpass reopened with a new design.
 June 3, 2016: a 96-car oil train derailed in the Columbia River Gorge near Mosier, Oregon. Some  were eventually recovered.
 Mid-late 2018: the Niland Geyser, a moving mud pot, encroached on the railroad near the eastern shore of the Salton Sea, requiring extensive engineering work to first delay the movement and then build a temporary diversion.
 September 7, 2019: a Union Pacific train of two locomotives and three tank cars carrying liquefied petroleum gas derailed and crashed into an overpass support column at the Albina Yard in Portland, Oregon The support column is for the eastbound lanes of the six-lane Going Street overpass, which is the only public access to the major industrial area Swan Island for cars and trucks. Four lanes were left unsafe after the derailment. Two of six lanes remain closed as of November 14, 2019. The cause of the crash was broken rails. There was nobody on board the train which was remotely operated at the time of crash. In May 2020, another Union Pacific derailment damaged a different overpass which The Skanner described as an ongoing safety concern.
 March 21, 2022: a Union Pacific freight train derailed and fell from a viaduct in Colton, California.

San Antonio area
On June 28, 2004, a UP train collided with an idle BNSF train in a San Antonio suburb. In the course of the derailment, a 90-ton tank car carrying liquified chlorine was punctured. As the chlorine vaporized, a toxic "yellow cloud" formed, killing three and causing 43 hospitalizations. The costs of cleanup and property damaged during the incident exceeded $7 million. 
Investigations of the Macdona incident revealed several serious safety lapses on the part of the Union Pacific and its employees, including employees not following the company's own safety rules. While the immediate cause of the derailment was the UP crew's "fatigue", chlorine tank cars had been improperly placed near the front of the train, a danger in the case of derailment.

The Macdona incident was not the first derailment in the San Antonio area. Between May and November 1994, Union Pacific trains derailed five times, killing at least 4 people. Between June 2004 and March 2005, 10 trains derailed, killing as many people.

In the aftermath of Macdona, the Federal Railroad Administration signed a compliance agreement with the railroad in which the railroad promised to rectify the "notable deficiencies" that regulators found. But the relative impunity UP seemed to exhibit regarding the derailment led to suggestions that the FRA was far "too cozy...to the railroads." In March 2005, Texas Governor Rick Perry supported a plan to reroute trains around large urban population centers in Texas, including San Antonio, but such a plan was purely voluntary and had no timetable associated.

Trains have continued to derail in the area including an incident in June 2009 where tank cars containing chlorine and petroleum naptha xylene derailed, but did not spill.

Community responsibility

Transient camp and graffiti issues
The City of San Jose, California, threatened Union Pacific with a lawsuit in 2019 after years of complaints about transient and graffiti blight going unaddressed. For the first time in many years, Union Pacific cleaned out along the tracks starting in November 2019. San Jose Councilman Sergio Jimenez said "The reality is that Union Pacific has not been a good neighbor". 

San Jose's mayor Sam Liccardo said"At any given conference of mayors, you won't hear anyone expressing confidence that Union Pacific will respond nimbly or collaboratively," and "But we are hopeful that the (memorandum of understanding) will turn a page on Union Pacific's behavior in the past to enable a more collaborative relationship going forward."The Mercury News reports that company has been uncooperative and non responsive to working together, such as failing to come through with graffiti abatement as Union Pacific had promised the city.

2022 Utah Legislative Action
In 2022, Legislators in Utah brought forth two separate bills specifically aimed at Union Pacific. The first, HB181, was raised after some municipalities encountered resistance from Union Pacific when attempting to upgrade rail crossings. In Logan, Utah, Union Pacific altered a construction agreement to require the city to pay maintenance fees in perpetuity for an upgraded crossing, a mandate which was against state code. The proposed legislation would make it easier for municipalities to get crossing improvements approved, and clarifies which party must pay associated maintenance costs. The second bill, HB405, would have required Union Pacific to replace their ageing fleet of Tier 0 switching locomotives with hydrogen or electric engines by 2028, due to Utah having very poor air quality in winter months. According to Utah Senator Schultz, Union Pacific was uncooperative on the switching locomotive bill if Utah did not drop the railroad crossings bill. Ultimately, HB181 passed, and HB405 was dropped after Union Pacific made voluntary commitments to replace several tier 0 switching locomotives with less polluting tier 2 locomotives, as well as to test some all electric ones in the Utah Roper Rail Yard.

Environmental record
In Eugene, Oregon, where pollution from a century-old rail yard has been seeping into groundwater, the UP and the Oregon Department of Environmental Quality launched a study of ground contamination in 2008. The pollutants are mostly petroleum hydrocarbons, industrial solvents, and metals.

In 2007, Union Pacific Railroad worked with the US EPA to develop a way to reduce locomotive exhaust emissions. They discovered that adding an oxidation catalyst filtering canister to the diesel engine's exhaust manifold and using ultra-low-sulfur diesel fuel would reduce particulate emissions by about half, unburned hydrocarbons by 38 percent, and carbon monoxide by 82 percent.

The company's Fuel Master program rewards locomotive engineers who save the most fuel each month. The program has saved the company millions of dollars, much of which has been returned to the engineers. In 2006, the program's founder, Wayne Kennedy, received the John H. Chafee Environmental Award, and the program was recognized by Transportation Secretary Norman Mineta.

In January 2018, a former waste water operator at Union Pacific Albina Yard in Portland, Oregon, employed by the railroad's contractor Mott MacDonald negligently released thousands of gallons of oil into the environment. The operator was distracted by a cell phone and allowed the tank to overflow for over an hour. An engineering firm hired by Union Pacific estimates  of it was released into nearby Willamette River, not including the spill that was captured by the containment booms. Employees of United States Environmental Protection Agency who were working at facilities nearby placed booms to contain the oil spill. Federal prosecutors have charged the operator Robert LaRue Webb II with violation of the Clean Water Act for releasing the oil into the environment. Webb plead guilty in August 2019 and was sentenced to two years probation and a $2,500 fine.

In 2016, the Union Pacific Railroad Co. was named as a defendant in a lawsuit seeking cleanup of a contaminated rail yard site that operated in Lafayette, Louisiana, from the late 1800s until the 1960s.

In 2020, Houston residents living near a Union Pacific Railroad Company rail yard filed lawsuits against the Union Pacific. These lawsuits followed the finding by the State of Texas of a higher-than-expected incidence of certain cancers in residents living close to the yard.
A State of Texas report released in 2021 identified an additional cancer cluster of lymphoblastic leukemia in children.

EMP 
Union Pacific and Norfolk Southern are the largest owner-partners of EMP, a domestic freight interline intermodal freight transport service that rents and moves more than 35,000 53-foot containers and chassis throughout North America. Other partners in the freight company include CN Railway, CP Railway, I&M Rail Link, Iowa Interstate Railroad, Wisconsin Central Ltd., and Kansas City Southern Railway.

Union Pacific Railroad Museum

The Union Pacific Railroad Museum is a former Carnegie library in Council Bluffs, Iowa, that houses artifacts, photographs, and documents that trace the development of the railroad and the American West. The company pays upkeep on the privately owned building, which houses part of Union Pacific's corporate collection, one of the oldest in the United States. Holdings include weapons from the late 19th and 20th centuries, outlaw paraphernalia, a sampling of the immigrants' possessions, and a photograph collection comprising more than 500,000 images.

See also

 Central Pacific Railroad
 First transcontinental railroad
 Hell on Wheels (TV series involving Union Pacific set in 1865)
 History of rail transportation in California
 Kansas Pacific Railway
 Los Angeles and Salt Lake Railroad
 Missouri–Kansas–Texas Railroad
 Missouri Pacific Railroad
 Oregon Railroad and Navigation Company
 Oregon Short Line
 Pacific Fruit Express
 Railex
 Southern Pacific Transportation Company
 Sun Valley, Idaho
 Western Pacific Railroad

Notes

References

Further reading

 
  – covers impact of the railroad on the region it served from the 1860s to the 1890s.
  – heavily illustrated
 
 
 
 
  – the standard scholarly history
 
 
 
 

 illustrated account of the Union Pacific and other North American Railroads

External links

 

 
Class I railroads in North America
First transcontinental railroad
Arizona railroads
Arkansas railroads
California railroads
Colorado railroads
Idaho railroads
Illinois railroads
Iowa railroads
Kansas railroads
Louisiana railroads
Minnesota railroads
Missouri railroads
Montana railroads
Nebraska railroads
Nevada railroads
New Mexico railroads
Oklahoma railroads
Oregon railroads
Tennessee railroads
Texas railroads
Utah railroads
Washington (state) railroads
Wisconsin railroads
Wyoming railroads
Southern Pacific Railroad
Rail lines receiving land grants
Railway companies established in 1862
Railway companies disestablished in 1880
Railway companies established in 1897
Companies based in Omaha, Nebraska
Companies listed on the New York Stock Exchange
Defunct Michigan railroads
Defunct South Dakota railroads
Rail in St. Louis
Railway lines in Omaha, Nebraska
Superfund sites in Oregon
Economy of the Western United States
1862 establishments in Nebraska Territory
American companies established in 1862